Mustafa Al-Hawsawi (born May 4, 1983 in Medina, Saudi Arabia) is a Saudi Arabian professional basketball player.  He currently plays for the Al Nasr Riyadh Sports Club of the Saudi Premier League.

He played most minutes for the Saudi Arabia national basketball team at the 2014 Asian Games in South Korea.

Career overview
Mustafa Alhwsawi played professional basketball for the following teams:
 2009-14 Al Ansar 
 2014–present Al Nasr Riyadh

References

1983 births
Living people
Saudi Arabian men's basketball players
People from Medina
Power forwards (basketball)
Basketball players at the 2014 Asian Games
Asian Games competitors for Saudi Arabia
20th-century Saudi Arabian people
21st-century Saudi Arabian people